Thoda Hai Thode Ki Zaroorat Hai was an Indian soap opera that aired in 1997. The director Ravi Rai won numerous awards for the serial, and the series itself won the 'Best Television Serial Drama' award by Screen Awards in the year 1997. The story shows how hard it is for us humans to survive the death of our loved ones.

Cast
Sachin Khedekar...Vishal
Prajakti Deshmukh... Kavita
Alok Nath
Rita Bhaduri as Chandrima bhaduri's daughter
Simone Singh ... Chandni
Mahesh Thakur
Akshay Anand
Masumeh Makhija... Uma
Shruti Ulfat
Raju Kher ***Anupam Kher's brother
Nandita Puri... Neena

References

Indian television soap operas
Sony Entertainment Television original programming
1997 Indian television series debuts
1999 Indian television series endings